is a 1958 Japanese tokusatsu superhero television series created by Masaru Igami and produced by Senkosha, the series aired on NTV from November 4, 1958 to October 6, 1959, with a total of 49 episodes (comprising four separate adventures).  It was created to capitalize on the success of Shintoho's Super Giant (Starman) movie series.  In fact, the title hero (whose alter-ego was Waku-san, played by Toshio Mimura) bore a strong resemblance to Super Giant (known as "Starman" in the U.S.). The pair of Planet Prince theatrical featurettes, adapted from the Senkosha TV series, were produced by Toei Studios and filmed in black and white ToeiScope format.

Toei produced two theatrical movies in 1959 that featured the Planet Prince character, but wearing a completely different, more streamlined costume (and goggled helmet) than the one worn in the tv series.  The hero in these two movies was played by Tatsuo Umemiya.  The movies were released a week apart. The films were titled:

 Released: May 19, 1959
 Released: May 25, 1959

For TV release in America, these two Planet Prince movies were compiled into a 95-minute, English-dubbed movie entitled Prince of Space in 1962. It was also called The Star Prince, Planet Prince, or Prince Planet.

Production 
The TV version looks very similar to Super Giant (Starman), in that both wear cowled costumes and capes.  Each character also has superpowers and flies. The two-part movie version (produced by Toei) is very different, as Prince of Space wears a more streamlined costume, cape, and helmet with goggles. In the edited US version, he has no superpowers other than the invulnerability of his costume, but in a subplot unique to the Japanese version he is able to revert a man who was brainwashed by the Ginsei aliens back to a peaceful state.  In the films, he uses a wand-like laser gun and flies a small spaceship.

In the TV version, just like Moonlight Mask, the Planet Prince persona was listed in the credits as being played by "?" (even though the character never wore a mask to conceal his face).

In the film, Prince's enemy is called Ambassador Phantom of the Silver Planet (銀星のまぼろし大使) (this villain also appeared in one of the tv series' story arcs), while in the English-language version, the villain is called Dictator Phantom of the Planet Krankor. He (along with his henchmen) wears a large prosthetic nose and cowl that give him a decidedly chicken-like appearance, something that was constantly mocked when the film was featured on Mystery Science Theater 3000. Dictator Phantom and his henchmen also don't appear to wear undergarments, as is made painfully obvious in several shots.

A translation error in the English language dub has Prince of Space declare "Your weapons are useless against me!", implying he is invulnerable to them. In the Japanese version, this line simply had him implying that their weapons were ineffective because he was capable of dodging them. The English line leads to confusion as the Prince is constantly shown running away from the lasers in spite of his stated invulnerability.

Prince of Space was also featured on the nationally syndicated television series Cinema Insomnia. On the show, there is a commercial for the album Candles, Krankor and You where the Dictator Phantom sings various cover songs such as "Unforgettable" and "Summer Wind".

Cast 
(Americanized names in parentheses)

 Planet Prince/Waku-san (Prince of Space/Wally) - Tatsuo Umemiya
 Ambassador Phantom (Ambassador Dictator Phantom) - Joji Oka
 Sachiko (Susie) - Hiroko Mine
 Dr. Maki (Dr. Macken) - Ushio Akashi
 Ichiro (Johnnie) - Akira Asami
 Makoto (Mickey) - Koji Komori
 Kimiko (Kimmy) - Midori Tsuzuki
 Inspector Takeda (Commissioner) - Takashi Kanda
 Sawamoto (Dr. Sangamon) - Akira Tatematsu
 Shibasaki - Masahiko Naruse
 Mukai - Ken Sudo
 Newsreporter Tabei - Ken Hasebe
 Newsreporter Tono - Giichi Sugi
 Sakai - Koji Sahara
 Tsunoda - Tokio Kozuka
 Keichi Kawajima (Inspector) - Rin'ichi Yamamoto
 Dr. Naito - Hiroshi Katayama
 Newspaper reporter - Yuji Kitamine
 Phantom's henchmen - Riki Iwaki, Kenji Todoroki, Hiroshi Mihara, Nobuo Yana
 Dr. Tateishi (Dr. Fletcher) - Shusuke Sone
 Mrs. Tateishi - Kaoru Nakano
 Commander Koda - Akikane Sawa
 Secretary of Defense Fukuhara - Shiko Saito
 Major Munakata - Tadashi Minamikawa
 Colonel Matsuda - Junkichi Orimoto
 Colonel Watanabe - Junji Masuda
 The Guardian - Rinichi Yamamoto

Production credits 
 Planning - Sanehiko Okada
 Director - Eijiro Wakabayashi
 Producer - Sanehiko Sonoda
 Screenplay - Shin Morita
 Original Story - Masaru Igami
 Music - Hirooki Ogawa (stock music; uncredited), Katsuhisa Hattori
 Director of Photography - Masahiko Iimura
 Lighting - Kenzo Ginya
 Art Director - Shuichiro Nakamura
 Recording - Shozo Hirokami
 Film Editor - Yoshiki Nagasawa
 Director of Special Effects - Shozo Horai
 Assistant Director - Hajime Sato
 Production Assistant - Takeshi Nishii
Theme Song – "Planet Prince Song"
 Vocals - Kamitakada Junior Chorus
 Lyrics - Masaru Igami
 Composer - Katsuhisa Hattori

Reboot

References

External links
 
 Prince of Space Movie Poster by Alexander Leon of Alxlen.com
  on Cinema Insomnia

Mystery Science Theater 3000 
 
 Episode guide: 816- Prince of Space

Toei tokusatsu films
Tokusatsu television series
1959 films
1950s science fiction films
Japanese superhero films
1950s superhero films
1950s Japanese films
Films scored by Katsuhisa Hattori